Reidar Kaas (July 27, 1881 – May 18, 1952) was a Norwegian opera singer and actor.

Career
Kaas was a baritone. He took singing lessons with Raimund von zur-Mühlen in London and the tenor Ernesto Colli (1866–1928) in Milan. Kaas performed at La Scala in Milan, the Carlo Felice Theater in Genoa, and opera houses in Poznań, Hamburg, London, and Oslo. Kaas also appeared in film roles. He made his debut in the silent film Paria in 1916 as Doctor Berner. In 1932 he played a Gypsy chief in the film Fantegutten, which was his last film role.

Filmography
 1916: Paria as Berner, a doctor
 1932: Fantegutten as Parkas, a Gypsy chief

Family
Kaas was born in Oslo, the son of the wholesaler Christian Oluf Andresen (1850–1890) and Aagot Theodosia Kaas (1854–1919). In 1906 he married Eli Tandberg (born March 12, 1885), the daughter of the landowner Gudbrand Tandberg and Caroline Kristine Cortsen. They had a son, Gudbrand Kaas.

References

External links

Reidar Kaas at the Swedish Film Database

1881 births
1952 deaths
Norwegian operatic baritones
20th-century Norwegian male actors
Male actors from Oslo
20th-century Norwegian male singers
20th-century Norwegian singers